Nabannna (Bengali: নবান্ন) is a building in the city of Howrah (neighborhood of Kolkata) in Howrah district. Nabanna houses the temporary State Secretariat of the Indian state of West Bengal. It is located at Mandirtala, Shibpur. It was inaugurated on 5 October 2013 by Chief Minister of West Bengal Mamata Banerjee.

The building

The 14-story building housed the government's garment park, Hooghly River Bridge Commissioners (HRBC) and was turned into the new secretariat within a month and a half by the PWD department. The chief minister's office is located on the top floor. The 13th floor has the offices of the chief and home secretary. The 4th and 5th floor are the Home Departments.

References

Government of West Bengal
Buildings and structures in Howrah
Government buildings in West Bengal
Administrative headquarters of state governments in India
2010 establishments in West Bengal
Tourist attractions in Howrah